Ana Carolina (born 1974) is a Brazilian singer.

Ana Carolina may also refer to:
 Ana Carolina (album)
 Ana Carolina (director) (born 1943), Brazilian film director
 Ana Carolina da Fonseca (born 1978), Brazilian actress

Carolina, Ana